Lin Guoyu (born 2 March 2000) is a Chinese footballer currently playing as a defender for Shandong Taishan.

Club career
Lin Guoyu was promoted to the senior team of Shandong Luneng within the 2020 Chinese Super League season by the Head coach Li Xiaopeng. He would make his debut in a Chinese FA Cup game against Dalian Professional F.C. on 18 September 2020 in a 4-0 victory, where he came on as a substitute for Wang Tong. The following season he was loaned out to top tier club Wuhan and would go on to make his league debut on 3 January 2022 against Chongqing Liangjiang Athletic in a 2-1 defeat. On his return to Shandong, Lin would be included in a youth team  squad to participate in the 2022 AFC Champions League as the senior team were unable to participate, due to the strict Chinese COVID-19 quarantine regulations.

Career statistics

Notes

References

External links
 
Player profile at cs.sports.163.com

2000 births
Living people
Footballers from Qingdao
Footballers from Shandong
Chinese footballers
Association football defenders
Chinese Super League players
Shandong Taishan F.C. players
Wuhan F.C. players
21st-century Chinese people